Brook is a village on the Isle of Wight, England. According to the Post Office the 2011 census population was included in the civil parish of Brighstone.

Background

Brook is situated on the south west coast of the Island between Brighstone and Freshwater, and borders a section of rugged coastline, the Back of the Wight, facing into the English Channel and towards the famous Needles and west Wight cliffs.

Brook's principal public attraction is its proximity to a section of coast which is used by the public for walking, fossil hunting, kitesurfing and windsurfing. There is a small 'green' by the beach and a National Trust-owned section of land with a small car park, the nearby hamlet of Brookgreen is also owned by them. There are no toilets, no cafe and no souvenir shops. A chine leads down to Brook Bay, which is a semi-circular sweep of semi-rocky beach facing south west. The prevailing south-westerly winds scour the beach and alternately either pile up sand from the Dorset coast, or strip it bare, exposing rocks and sometimes fossils.

There is a section of reef extending from the shoreline for about half a mile into the English Channel. The hinterland of Brook rises steeply from the coastal road to join the chalk spine which stretches from one end of the Island to the other.

Church
St. Mary's Church, Brook is perched on a small hillock at the top of the village. It was rebuilt in 1864 following a disastrous fire on 16 December 1863 [this date quoted from W.H. Davenport Adams, 1873, although Lloyd and Pevsner, 2006, says 1862]. The oldest surviving part of the church probably dates from the 13th century.

Transport
It is linked to other parts of the Island by Southern Vectis bus route 12, serving Freshwater, Totland and Newport as well as intermediate villages.  The Island Coaster bus also serves the south side of Brook on its journey between Ryde, Sandown Bay, Alum Bay and Yarmouth.

References

Villages on the Isle of Wight
Brighstone